Chlestakows Wiederkehr, op. 149, (Khlestakov's Return) is an opera in three acts by Giselher Klebe. He also wrote the libretto, based on the play Der Revisor (The Government Inspector) by Nikolai Gogol. The work lasts about 70 minutes.

The opera premiered on 11 April 2008 at the Landestheater Detmold, Germany. It is Klebe's first and only comedic opera. His adaptation of the text is only loosely based on Gogol and adds a significant twist in the final scene.

The role names above are spelled as in the German text.

References

External links
Performance review: 
Interview: 

German-language operas
Operas by Giselher Klebe
Operas
2008 operas
Operas based on plays
Operas set in Russia
Operas based on works by Nikolai Gogol
Works based on The Government Inspector